Jacques de Rougé, marquis du Plessis-Bellière (1602–1654) was a French general. He married Suzanne de Bruc de Monplaisir.

References

Rouge, Jacque du Plessis-Belliere
Marquesses of Plessis-Bellière